Simão Freitas (born 10 December 1980) is a Portuguese professional football manager.

Managerial career
In January 2016, Freitas was appointed head coach of Moldovan club Zimbru Chișinău.

References

External links
 
 Simão Freitas at Leballonrond

1980 births
Living people
FC Zimbru Chișinău managers
Portuguese football managers
Expatriate football managers in Moldova
Moldovan Super Liga managers